Events in the year 1990 in Japan. It corresponds to Heisei 2 (平成2年) in the Japanese calendar.

1990 was the last year of the Japanese asset price bubble.

Incumbents
 Emperor: Akihito
 Prime Minister: Toshiki Kaifu (L–Aichi)
 Chief Cabinet Secretary: Mayumi Moriyama (Councillor, L–Tochigi) until February 28, Misoji Sakamoto (L–Ishikawa)
 Chief Justice of the Supreme Court: Kōichi Yaguchi until February 19, Ryōhachi Kusaba from February 20
 President of the House of Representatives: Hajime Tamura (L–Mie) until January 24, Yoshio Sakurauchi (L–Shimane) from February 27
 President of the House of Councillors: Yoshihiko Tsuchiya (L–Saitama)
 Diet sessions: 117th (regular session opened in December 1989, to January 24), 118th (special, February 27 to June 26), 119th (extraordinary, October 12 to November 10), 120th (regular, December 10 to 1991, May 8)

Governors
Aichi Prefecture: Reiji Suzuki 
Akita Prefecture: Kikuji Sasaki
Aomori Prefecture: Masaya Kitamura
Chiba Prefecture: Takeshi Numata
Ehime Prefecture: Sadayuki Iga
Fukui Prefecture: Yukio Kurita
Fukuoka Prefecture: Hachiji Okuda
Fukushima Prefecture: Eisaku Satō
Gifu Prefecture: Taku Kajiwara
Gunma Prefecture: Ichiro Shimizu
Hiroshima Prefecture: Toranosuke Takeshita 
Hokkaido: Takahiro Yokomichi 
Hyogo Prefecture: Toshitami Kaihara 
Ibaraki Prefecture: Fujio Takeuchi
Ishikawa Prefecture: Yōichi Nakanishi 
Iwate Prefecture:   
Kagawa Prefecture: Jōichi Hirai
Kagoshima Prefecture: Yoshiteru Tsuchiya
Kanagawa Prefecture: Kazuji Nagasu
Kochi Prefecture: Chikara Nakauchi
Kumamoto Prefecture: Morihiro Hosokawa 
Kyoto Prefecture: Teiichi Aramaki
Mie Prefecture: Ryōzō Tagawa
Miyagi Prefecture: Shuntarō Honma
Miyazaki Prefecture: Suketaka Matsukata
Nagano Prefecture: Gorō Yoshimura
Nagasaki Prefecture: Isamu Takada
Nara Prefecture: Shigekiyo Ueda
Niigata Prefecture: Kiyoshi Kaneko
Oita Prefecture: Morihiko Hiramatsu 
Okayama Prefecture: Shiro Nagano
Okinawa Prefecture: Junji Nishime (until 9 December); Masahide Ōta (starting 10 December)
Osaka Prefecture: Sakae Kishi
Saga Prefecture: Kumao Katsuki
Saitama Prefecture: Yawara Hata 
Shiga Prefecture: Minoru Inaba 
Shiname Prefecture: Nobuyoshi Sumita
Shizuoka Prefecture: Shigeyoshi Saitō
Tochigi Prefecture: Fumio Watanabe
Tokushima Prefecture: Shinzo Miki
Tokyo: Shun'ichi Suzuki 
Tottori Prefecture: Yuji Nishio
Toyama Prefecture: Yutaka Nakaoki
Wakayama Prefecture: Shirō Kariya
Yamagata Prefecture: Seiichirō Itagaki
Yamaguchi Prefecture: Toru Hirai
Yamanashi Prefecture: Kōmei Mochizuki

Events
 February 18: Elections for the House of Representatives.
 February 28: Second Kaifu cabinet formed.
 March 10: Keiyo Line opens between Tokyo and Chiba.
 March 18: A supermarket store fire in Amagasaki, Hyogo Prefecture, according to official confirmed report; 15 fatalities, with 6 people injured.
 April 1: International Flower Exposition opens in Osaka.
 June 29: Fumihito, Prince Akishino, second son of Emperor Akihito, weds Kiko Kawashima.
 July 2: A heavy torrential rain and landslide hit in Aso-Kujyu area, part of Oita Prefecture and Kumamoto Prefecture, according to Fire and Disaster Management agency official confirmed report, 32 person fatalities with 109 person injures.  
 August 13: Orix Braves baseball team announces that it will move to Kobe and become the Orix BlueWave.
 September 19 – 20: According to Fire and Disaster Management Agency official confirmed report, Typhoon Flo, hit powerful strong wind, flash flood, tornado hit in around Honshu, total 44 person were death, 197 person were hurt.   
 September 27: A MBB/Kawasaki BK 117 helicopter crash into mountain in Hyuga, Miyazaki Prefecture, according to Japan Transport Safety Board official confirmed report, 10 persons were lost to lives.   
 November 12: Akihito is enthroned as Emperor of Japan.
 November 21: Nintendo releases its second video game console, the Super Famicom, in Japan.
 December 29: Kaifu cabinet reshuffled.
 Date unknown:
Roland JX-1 music synthesizer is released.

Births
 January 24
Mao Abe, singer-songwriter
Ryosuke Irie, swimmer
 January 31: Kota Yabu singer and actor
 February 4: Haruka Tomatsu, voice actress
 February 15
Masashi Ebinuma, judoka
Rina Sumioka, singer-songwriter.
 March 11: Ryosuke Kikuchi, professional baseball player
 March 17: Tamamori Yuta, actor and singer
 March 24: Izumi Kato, swimmer
 March 26: Yuya Takaki, actor and singer
 April 5: Haruma Miura, actor and singer (d. 2020)
 April 16: Risa Honma, idol
 April 21: Abroad in Japan, British-born Youtuber based in Japan
 June 1: Rie Murakawa, voice actress and singer
 June 15: Miwa, singer
 June 22: Kei Inoo, singer and actor
 June 29: Sayuri Sugawara, singer
 July 3: Nana Iwasaka, volleyball player
 July 11: Risa Shinnabe, volleyball player
 July 21: Sayuri Iwata, model
 August 3: Chiemi Blouson, comedian
 August 6: Natsuko Aso, actress and singer
 August 13: Sae Miyazawa, idol
 September 19: Saki Fukuda, actress
 September 23: Yōhei Kagitani, professional baseball pitcher 
 September 25: Mao Asada, figure skater
 September 27: Atsumi Tanezaki, voice actress
 October 4: Saki, guitarist and songwriter
November 12: Hideto Asamura, professional baseball player
 November 15
Kanata Hongō, actor and model
Erika Yazawa, gravure idol
 November 28: Hayato Katsuki, race walker
 December 2: Hikaru Yaotome, singer and songwriter
 December 10: Shoya Tomizawa, motorcycle rider (d. 2010)
 December 20: Minami Takahashi, voice actress
 December 22: Chika Anzai, voice actress
 December 23: Yu Horiuchi, wrestler

Deaths
 January 20: Prince Higashikuni, prime minister of Japan (b. 1887)
 April 13: Norio Kijima, announcer and politician (b. 1925) 
 June 13: Michiyo Kogure, film actress (b. 1918)
 June 15: Nobuo Arai, swimmer (b. 1909)
 July 23: Kenjiro Takayanagi, television engineer, creator of the world's first all-electronic television receiver  (b. 1899)
 September 1: Edwin O. Reischauer, former U.S. ambassador (b. 1910)
 September 25: Togyu Okumura, modern painter (b. 1889)
 November 5: Shunkichi Kikuchi, photographer (b. 1916)
 December 4: Naoto Tajima, athlete (b. 1912)
 December 28: Seiji Hisamatsu, film director (b. 1912)

Statistics
Yen value: US$1 = ¥129 (low) to ¥159 (high)

See also
 1990 in Japanese television
 List of Japanese films of 1990

References

 
Years of the 20th century in Japan
Japan

ja:長崎屋火災